Kravtsov is a Russian language surname, of Western Slavic origin "krawc" coming from Polish form for krawiec/kravets, "tailor" (the native Russian word for "tailor" is portnoy). The official transcription for time of Russian Empire and during Russian Civil War was Krawtzoff.

It may refer to:

Politics
 Boris Kravtsov (born 1922), Russian jurist and politician
 Sergey Kravtsov (politician) (born 1974), Russian politician

Sport
 Aleksandr Kravtsov (born 1974), Russian high jumper
 Elena Krawzow (born 1993), German Paralympic swimmer
 Denis Kravtsov (born 1990), Russian footballer
 Grzegorz Krawców (born 1962), Polish sprint canoer
 Igor Kravtsov (born 1973), Russian rower
 Pavlo Kravtsov (born 2000), Ukrainian footballer
 Sergey Mikhailovich Kravtsov (born 1960), Belarusian Olympic sailor
 Sergey Tarasovich Kravtsov (born 1948), Ukrainian Olympic cyclist
 Viacheslav Kravtsov (born 1987), Ukrainian basketball player
 Vladimir Kravtsov (1949–1999), Russian handball player
 Vitali Kravtsov (born 1999), Russian hockey player

Military
Colonel Alexander J. Kravtsov (1893–1920),  military commander during Russian Civil War
General Petr G. Kravtsov (1861–1919), Major General of the Don Army

Nobility
Kravtsov family (Don Cossacks) - Don Cossacks noble family
Kravtsov family (Orenburg), a noble family from Orenburg.

Other persons
 Major Natalya Meklin, née Kravtsova (1922–2005), was a much decorated World War II combat pilot in women-only air regiment of Night Witches.
Sergey Kravtsov (disambiguation), several people with this name

See also
 
8812 Kravtsov, a main-belt asteroid

References

Occupational surnames
Russian-language surnames
Polish-language surnames
Ukrainian-language surnames